Gryphaea arcuata is an extinct species of foam oyster, a bivalve mollusc in the family Gryphaeidae from the Early Jurassic of Europe.

It is commonly referred to in English folklore as the 'devils toenail' due to its supposed resemblance to the devil's 'cloven hoof'.

Sources

Gryphaea arcuata in the Paleobiology Database
 Fossils (Smithsonian Handbooks) by David Ward (Page 101)

Gryphaeidae
Jurassic bivalves
Early Jurassic animals
Early Jurassic life of Europe
Jurassic animals of Europe